Iprodione is a hydantoin fungicide and nematicide.

Application
Iprodione is used on crops affected by Botrytis bunch rot, Brown rot, Sclerotinia and other fungal diseases in plants. It is currently applied in a variety of crops: fruit, vegetables, ornamental trees and shrubs and on lawns. It is a contact fungicide that inhibits the germination of fungal spores and it blocks the growth of the fungal mycelium.

It has been marketed under the brand name "Rovral" and "Chipco green" (both brands of Bayer CropScience). This chemical was developed originally by Rhône-Poulenc Agrochimie (later Aventis CropScience and in 2002 acquired by Bayer). As of 2004 there were no composition patents on iprodione.

DevGen NV (Now part of Syngenta) discovered that iprodione kills nematodes and filed for patent protection for those uses.  

Iprodione was approved in the Turkish market under the brand name Devguard for use on tomatoes and cucumbers in 2009,  and was approved in the US as Enclosure for use in commercial peanut production in May 2010.

Iprodione was approved in Europe in 2010, but approval was not renewed in 2017.

References

External links
 

Fungicides
Hydantoins
Pesticides
Chloroarenes
Isopropylamino compounds
Secondary amines